Arandan Rural District is a rural district (dehestan) in the Central District of Sanandaj County, Kurdistan Province, Iran. At the 2006 census, its population was 4,012, in 946 families. The rural district has 7 villages.

References 

Rural Districts of Kurdistan Province
Sanandaj County